Gossip is a 2000 American teen psychological thriller film directed by Davis Guggenheim. It is produced by Warner Bros. and stars James Marsden, Lena Headey, Norman Reedus and Kate Hudson.

Plot
On a Northeastern United States college campus, Derrick Webb, Cathy Jones (referred to as simply "Jones") and Travis are students, as well as roommates. Derrick and Jones share an attraction but have not acted on it. Travis is devoted to Derrick as the wealthy Derrick lets the penniless Travis live rent free in the spacious apartment and focus on his art.

They all take a Communications class with Professor Goodwin, in which the subject of gossip is brought up. As they enjoy telling lies, the three decide to start a rumor for their final paper and track the results.

One night, while at a party, they run into Naomi Preston and her boyfriend, Beau Edson. It is common knowledge through the campus that Naomi doesn't sleep around. Jones, in particular, has a problem with Naomi's wealth and sense of entitlement. Furthermore, Naomi seems to have started a rumor about Jones having sex with Goodwin.

While at the party, Derrick meets a girl and brings her upstairs. At this point, the girl becomes ill; from the bathroom, Derrick witnesses Beau and Naomi in the adjacent room kissing. Beau attempts to have sex with Naomi but is rejected. Beau leaves and Naomi passes out. Derrick, Jones and Travis decide to begin a rumor that Naomi and Beau did have sex. The rumor spreads across campus, changing quickly. Jones writes her paper while Travis turns the rumor into an art installation full of warped photos of Naomi.

Eventually Naomi discovers the rumor. Beau denies it but witnesses remember him seemingly celebrating with his friends. Since Naomi doesn't remember anything, she becomes convinced she was raped by Beau; under the encouragement of her friends, she reports it to the police. As a result, Beau is arrested. Jones feels remorse at the turns of events, but Derrick and Travis convince her to stay quiet.

Jones goes to speak to Naomi and realizes she and Derrick went to the same high school, Danbury. However, when she mentions Derrick by name, Naomi freaks and throws her out of her dorm.  When Jones confronts Derrick, he claims not to know Naomi.

Jones travels to Danbury and finds yearbook photos that show Derrick and Naomi were a couple during their time at school. She speaks to a staff member who reveals what happened.  Much like Beau, Naomi refused Derrick, but Derrick did rape Naomi. When Jones confronts Derrick, he claims the sex was consensual, but Naomi made it up so her father would not be upset with her. His reputation at Danbury plummeted and his family turned their backs on him. After seeing Naomi at the party, he admits he wanted to spread a rumor about Naomi as revenge. Jones is horrified but Travis believes Derrick's story.

Jones tries to confess to the police, but Derrick manipulates events to make it look like Jones is in love with Beau and they do not believe her. Even Travis refuses to help her, reminding her of everything Derrick has done for them.

Beau learns of Derrick's assault of Naomi, and the two fight. Derrick manages to manipulate Beau into thinking they are both victims of Naomi's lies before knocking him unconscious.

Derrick goes to Naomi's dorm. He taunts her with the truth of the night of the party and reveals he did this in revenge for her ruining his life. He even admits to raping her.  Naomi attacks him and he leaves.

The next day, Naomi is pronounced dead from suicide. However due to Derrick and Naomi's past (plus the new marks on Derrick's face), police come to accuse Derrick of killing her. This rumor spreads around campus and everyone turns on Derrick. Investigators come to his apartment to search for clues. Travis overhears Derrick trying to blame Travis, using Travis' art as proof. Heartbroken, Travis flees the apartment and Jones also leaves in disgust. However, the detective seems convinced Derrick is guilty and leaves to get a warrant.

Feeling his life is falling apart, Derrick packs a bag while Jones witnesses Travis buying a gun on the street. She goes back to the apartment to warn Derrick, but Travis has got there first. In a struggle for the gun, Derrick seems to fatally shoot Jones. In a panic, Derrick tries to convince Travis to take the blame. Travis refuses and resolves to get the police back and confess everything. Desperately, Derrick confesses to raping Naomi.

Derrick's confession replays on the recording equipment Travis keeps around the apartment. At this point, Jones stands up, Professor Goodwin enters and Naomi appears from the other room with Beau. The police are revealed to be Naomi's driver and a student from Jones' Calculus class. The investigation was a setup to trick Derrick into confessing on camera. As everyone abandons Derrick, Goodwin insinuates that he too has heard the rumor of him and Jones having an affair.

Cast
 James Marsden as Derrick Webb
 Lena Headey as Cathy Jones
 Norman Reedus as Travis
 Kate Hudson as Naomi Preston
 Eric Bogosian as Professor Goodwin
 Edward James Olmos as Detective Curtis
 Joshua Jackson as Beau Edson
 Sharon Lawrence as Detective Kelly
 Marisa Coughlan as Sheila
 Novie Edwards as Ms. Waters
Anthony J. Mifsud as Doorman

Production

Filming took place in Toronto and Uxbridge, Ontario, Canada from October to December 1998.

Reception

Critical response

Box office

The film opened at #12 at the North American box office making $2.3 million USD in its opening weekend. The film suffered a 59% decline in box office earnings the following week, descending to #17.

References

External links
 
 
 
 

2000 films
2000s psychological drama films
2000 psychological thriller films
2000s teen drama films
American psychological drama films
American teen drama films
American psychological thriller films
2000 directorial debut films
Films directed by Davis Guggenheim
Village Roadshow Pictures films
Films set in the United States
Films set in universities and colleges
Films scored by Graeme Revell
Warner Bros. films
2000 drama films
2000s English-language films
2000s American films